Whitwell is a civil parish in the Bolsover District of Derbyshire, England.  The parish contains 15 listed buildings that are recorded in the National Heritage List for England.  Of these, two are listed at Grade I, the highest of the three grades, one is at Grade II*, the middle grade, and the others are at Grade II, the lowest grade.  The parish contains the village of Whitwell and the surrounding area.  The listed buildings include churches, houses, farmhouses and farm buildings, a public house, a village pump, and a war memorial.


Key

Buildings

References

Citations

Sources

 

Lists of listed buildings in Derbyshire